Connor Krempicki (born 14 September 1994) is a German professional footballer who plays as a midfielder for 1. FC Magdeburg.

Career
On 24 June 2019, Krempicki moved to MSV Duisburg. He made his debut on 20 July 2019 in a 4–1 win over Sonnenhof Großaspach. He extended his contract until the end of the 2020–21 season on 28 July 2020. On 26 May 2021, it was announced that he would leave Duisburg at the end of the 2020–21 season. He moved to 1. FC Magdeburg afterwards.

Personal life
Born in Germany, Krempicki is of Polish descent.

Career statistics

References

External links

1994 births
Living people
German people of Polish descent
Sportspeople from Gelsenkirchen
German footballers
Footballers from North Rhine-Westphalia
Association football midfielders
TSG 1899 Hoffenheim II players
FC Viktoria Köln players
Bonner SC players
KFC Uerdingen 05 players
MSV Duisburg players
1. FC Magdeburg players
2. Bundesliga players
3. Liga players
Regionalliga players